Puretracks was a Canadian online music store, which launched officially on October 14, 2003. Puretracks works as a behind-the-scene music partner. Now a division of Somerset Entertainment, owned by Fluid Music, Puretracks has U.S. and Canadian licensing agreements with all major labels and hundreds of independent labels worldwide—enabling them to offer well over three million top music tracks across every genre. The majority of music is sold at 256 to 320 kbit/s MP3 files.

As of February 20, 2007, Puretracks started offering the majority of its collection in MP3 format without DRM, an approach advocated by theories such as the Open Music Model.

Puretracks shut down in August, 2013.

Mac compatibility
Both the Puretracks Canadian and US stores are Mac compatible. Tracks and albums downloaded from the store are saved and downloaded into a music player.

Puretracks Music Store
The Puretracks music store was one of the largest digital music download stores in North America, offering more than 3.4 million tracks from top mainstream and indie artists across a complete range of genres.

It also offered multilingual music stores and customer support, with toggles between English and French in the Canadian music store, and a separate Latin music store (featuring Spanish and English toggles) tailored to the Latino population in the United States.

References

External links
Puretracks Corporate site

Music retailers of Canada
Online music stores of Canada
Retail companies established in 2003
Internet properties established in 2003
Retail companies disestablished in 2013
Defunct online music stores
2013 disestablishments in Canada